Parramatta Power Soccer Club were a professional association football club who were based in the Western Sydney city of Parramatta.  They played in the National Soccer League from season 1999-00 until the league folded in 2004.  The Power were runners up to Perth Glory in the 2003–04 season of the NSL, both on the ladder and in the grand final, after Perth took control in extra time and scored the golden goal winner in horrendous weather to become the final NSL champions.

The club was backed by the Parramatta Leagues club which also owns the Parramatta Eels rugby league team. The club played at Parramatta Stadium (the home of the Eels) and played in gold and blue (the Eels colours). The club suffered from poor attendances throughout its existence, partly because of its links to the Eels, as well as it being in the already crowded Western Sydney football market.

National Soccer League history

Kit info

Performance (by club)

Carlton S.C. folded during the 2000–01 season, 2 matches awarded 3–0 to Parramatta on forfeit.

Honours
 National Soccer League Premiership
Runners-up (1): 2003–04

 National Soccer League Championship
Runners-up (1): 2004

External links
Statistics on Parramatta Power in NSL
Player Rosters
History of Parramatta Power Soccer Kits

Association football clubs established in 1999
Association football clubs disestablished in 2004
Defunct soccer clubs in Australia
National Soccer League (Australia) teams
Soccer clubs in Sydney
1999 establishments in Australia
2004 disestablishments in Australia
Sport in Parramatta
Parramatta Eels